Baden is a northern community in the Canadian province of Manitoba. It is part of a group of five communities in the region, all built to serve logging operations in the Porcupine Provincial Forest. The others are National Mills, Powell, Red Deer Lake, and the largest, Barrows, where the nearest school and fire service are located. The community contains 15 housing units.

It was named by the Canadian National Railway after Sir Robert Baden-Powell, a British General.

Demographics 

References

Geographic Names of Manitoba - the Millennium Bureau of Canada

Designated places in Manitoba
Northern communities in Manitoba